Château de Lalande or Château de la Lande may refer to: 

 Château de Lalande (Indre)
 , a château in Mayenne, Pays-de-la-Loire
 Château de la Lande (Rocles), Allier
 , Vienne
 , Allier

See also
 Château Pichon Longueville Comtesse de Lalande, a winery
 Château de Lalinde, a château in Lalinde, Dordogne, France
 Lalande (disambiguation)